Pseudocordylus microlepidotus, the Cape crag lizard, is a species of lizard native to shrublands and grasslands of South Africa. Three subspecies have been named: Pseudocordylus microlepidotus microlepidotus, Pseudocordylus microlepidotus fasciatus, and Pseudocordylus microlepidotus namaquensis. The species is ovoviviparous. The species is protected under CITES.

Description 
The two sexes are very similar in size, however males exhibit a larger head than females. Males also develop more glands than females. The sexes begin to differentiate before sexual maturity.

References 

Reptiles of South Africa
Reptiles described in 1829
Pseudocordylus
Taxa named by Georges Cuvier